Aadu Puli Aattam is a 1977 Indian Tamil-language action film directed by S. P. Muthuraman, starring Kamal Haasan, Rajinikanth, Sangeetha and Sripriya. Later in 1978, S. P. Muthuraman remade the film in Telugu as Yetthuku Pai Yetthu, It was a partial remake of Aadu Puli Aattum. A few scenes were remade in Telugu with Telugu actors like Satyanarayana and Allu Ramalingaiah and the rest of the film was dubbed.

Plot 

The movie starts with Kamal and Rajini, close associates, playing this game in a bar. When the game is finished, the couple, along with their gang ransack the bar and loot the money. In brief, this is the story of a young man who dreams of becoming a policeman, but decides to oppose the police and heads a gang of thieves. When he discovers that his associates are much worse than thieves, he joins the police and nabs the criminals.

Cast 
Kamal Haasan as Madhan
Sripriya as Hema
Rajinikanth as Rajini
Sangeetha as Mary
Major Sundarrajan as Inspector of police
Thengai Srinivasan as Krishnamoorthy Iyer
Jayachandran as Balu
K. Natraj as Natraj
Muthaiah as Muthaiah
Aparna
Aanandhi
M. S. Draupadi
T. K. S. Natarajan
Nanjil Nalini

Production 
The film was directed by S. P. Muthuraman, written by Mahendran and produced by M. Santhinarayanan, who began life as a costume-maker before rising to become a film producer. The song "Uravo Pudumai", picturised on Kamal Haasan and Sangeeta, was filmed on the area of Kundrathur and Thiruneermalai near Chennai. During a fight scene on Mount Road, Kamal Haasan was injured on set. Haasan fixed his shoulder dislocation with a turkey towel and an iron rod on the sets. He returned to the shot after taking just a 10-minute break. The film is noted for Rajinikanth's famous phrase "Idhu thaan Rajini style" (This is Rajini Style), which he says several times throughout the film. This film was shot in black-and-white. It was given an "U" (unrestricted) certificate by the Central Board of Film Certification after eight cuts.

Soundtrack 
All songs written by Kannadasan, Panchu Arunachalam, and 'Poovai' Senguttuvan and composed by Vijaya Bhaskar.

Release 
Aadu Puli Attam was released on 30 September 1977, and became a commercial success.

References

Bibliography

External links 
 

1970s Tamil-language films
1977 action films
1977 films
Films directed by S. P. Muthuraman
Films scored by Vijaya Bhaskar
Indian action films
Indian black-and-white films